The Wisconsin Glacial Episode, also called the Wisconsin glaciation, was the most recent glacial period of the North American ice sheet complex. This advance included the Cordilleran Ice Sheet, which nucleated in the northern North American Cordillera; the Innuitian ice sheet, which extended across the Canadian Arctic Archipelago; the Greenland ice sheet; and the massive Laurentide Ice Sheet, which covered the high latitudes of central and eastern North America. This advance was synchronous with global glaciation during the last glacial period, including the North American alpine glacier advance, known as the Pinedale glaciation. The Wisconsin glaciation extended from approximately 75,000 to 11,000 years ago, between the Sangamonian Stage and the current interglacial, the Holocene. The maximum ice extent occurred approximately 25,000–21,000 years ago during the last glacial maximum, also known as the Late Wisconsin in North America.

This glaciation radically altered the geography north of the Ohio River. At the height of the Wisconsin Episode glaciation, the ice sheet covered most of Canada, the Upper Midwest, and New England, as well as parts of Idaho, Montana, and Washington. On Kelleys Island in Lake Erie, northern New Jersey and in New York City's Central Park, the grooves left in rock by these glaciers can be easily observed. In southwestern Saskatchewan and southeastern Alberta a suture zone between the Laurentide and Cordilleran ice sheets formed the Cypress Hills, North America's northernmost point that remained south of the continental ice sheets. During much of the glaciation, sea level was low enough to permit land animals, including humans, to occupy Beringia (the Bering Land Bridge) and move between North America and Siberia. As the glaciers retreated, glacial lakes were breached in great floods of water such as the Kankakee Torrent, which reshaped the landscape south of modern Chicago as far as the Ohio and Mississippi Rivers.

Times
Two related movements have been termed Wisconsin: Early Wisconsin and Late Wisconsin. The Early Wisconsin was the bigger of the two and extend farther west and south.  It retreated an unknown distance before halting.  During this period of quiet, the glacial deposits were eroded and weathered.  This first Wisconsin period erased all the Illinoian glacial topography that extended over. The Late Wisconsin ice sheet extended more towards the west than the earlier movements.  This may have been due to changes in the accumulation center of the ice sheet, topographic changes introduced by the Early phase or by pressure changes in the ice mass in the north.

Continental ice sheets

Ice caps

Labrador Ice Sheet

The Labrador Ice Sheet centered east of Hudson Bay. Its eastern lobes covered New England and reached south to Cape Cod and Long Island, New York.

Ice lobes

Keewatin Ice Sheet
The Keewatin Ice Sheet began west of Hudson Bay in the Canadian Territory of Keewatin. The ice moved south some  into Kansas and Missouri.  To the west, it reached  to the foothills of the Rocky Mountains.

Cordilleran Ice Sheet

The Cordilleran Ice Sheet has left remnants throughout the Northern Rocky Mountains. Unlike the other two ice sheets, this one is mountain based covering British Columbia and reaching into northern Washington State and Montana. The Cordilleran Ice Sheet has more of an Alpine style of many glaciers merged into a whole. The striations made by the ice field in moving over the bedrock show that it moved principally to the west through the passes of the coast range.

Formation of proglacial and prehistoric lakes

Whenever the ice sheet melted from the north at a moraine, water would begin to pond in the divide between a moraine and the ice front. The ice would act as a dam as water could not drain through the ice sheet, which in the Wisconsin period covered most of the proglacial river valleys. Numerous small, isolated water bodies formed between the moraine and the ice front.  As the ice sheet would continue to melt and recede northward, these ponds combined into proglacial lakes.  In areas without an available outlet, the water levels would either continue to rise until reaching one or more low spots along the rim of a moraine, or the ice sheet would retreat, opening access to a lower portion of the moraine. Multiple outlets could form through low spots too until one would become dominant after erosion lowered both the outlet and lake surface.

Running  water
Ice melt and rainfall carried large quantities of clay, sand, and gravel from the ice mass.  Clays could be moved long distances by moving water, while sand and gravel could not.  Thus, sand and gravel landforms developed along the sides and front of the ice sheet; elongated accumulations of this material are known as kames.  Mounds along the frontal edge of the ice are called moraines.  Wherever a subglacial tunnel began infilling, long winding formations known as eskers would form. The sweeping plain of sand and gravel beyond the ice margin and a terminal moraine is called an outwash plain . The materials left under the glacier when it melts back is called the ground moraine or till plain.  Till is highly permeable and creates a large ground reserve for water.  This formation is highly desirable for human economic development as a source of water.

Stages of the Wisconsin episode

Role in human migration
Prehistoric human migration was likely greatly influenced by this last glacial period, as during much of the Wisconsin era, the formation of a land bridge known as Beringia across the Bering Strait is believed to have allowed human occupation of this area which provided potential access for some of the first humans to move between North America and Siberia in Asia (see Settlement of the Americas). Other human migration routes also opened during interglacial periods in both Europe and Asia.

Flora and fauna
North American flora and fauna species were distributed quite differently during the Wisconsin era, due to altered temperatures, surface water distribution, and in some cases coverage of earth surface by glaciers. A number of scientific studies have been conducted to determine species distribution, particularly during the Late Wisconsin and early to mid-Holocene. An example of findings is from the investigation of flora species using pollen core samples in present-day northern Arizona. Here in the Waterman Hills researchers found that Juniperus osteosperma and Pinus monophylla were early to mid-Holocene dominant trees, while Monardella arizonica has been a continuously present understory plant. Celtis reticulata is an example of a plant present in the early Holocene following Wisconsin glacial retreat, a species no longer present at the Waterman Mountains site.

See also

Pleistocene historic names

References

External links and references

 britannica.com reference

Glaciology of Canada
Glaciology of the United States
Ice ages
Pleistocene geology
Pleistocene United States
Quaternary Canada
Quaternary Colorado
Quaternary Michigan
Quaternary Minnesota
Quaternary Montana
Quaternary Wisconsin
Quaternary Wyoming
Last Glacial Period